Sri Lanka competed at the 2022 Commonwealth Games in Birmingham, England from 28 July to 8 August 2022. This was Sri Lanka's 17th appearance at the Commonwealth Games.

On June 30, 2022 the National Olympic Committee of Sri Lanka announced a team of 114 athletes (54 men and 60 women).  For the first time ever, more women will compete than men. On July 19, 2022, the table tennis team of four male athletes was withdrawn, meaning the final team size was 50 men and 60 women (110 total athletes) competing in 13 sports.

Weightlifter Indika Dissanayake and cricketer Chamari Athapaththu were the country's flagbearers during the opening ceremony.

Sri Lanka finished the competition with four medals (one silver and three bronze), ranking the country 31st overall on the medal table. Sri Lanka won its first ever Commonwealth Games medal in the sport of wrestling.

Competitors
The following is the list of number of competitors participating at the Games per sport/discipline.

Medalists

3x3 basketball

By virtue of its status as the top Commonwealth Asian nation in the respective FIBA 3x3 Federation Rankings for men and women (on 1 November 2021), Sri Lanka qualified for both tournaments.

Summary

Men's tournament

Roster
Simron Yogananthan
Janith Chathuranga
Supun Rukshan
Arnold Thevakumar

Group A

Women's tournament

Roster
Nihari Perera
Chalani Perera
Fathima Morseth
Rashmi Perera

Group A

Athletics

On April 26, 2022, the Athletics Association of Sri Lanka named a team of eight athletes (four of each gender). On June 1, 2022, Hiruni Wijayaratne was dropped from the team for unknown reasons. Ushan Thiwanka later withdrew, citing a lack of preparation. Para-athlete Palitha Bandara will also compete.

On 3 August 2022, Yupun Abeykoon won the bronze medal after finishing the race in 10.14 seconds. Abeykoon also became the first Sri Lankan to win a Commonwealth Games medal in athletics after 24 years since Sriyani Kulawansa and Sugath Thilakaratne's medal feats at the 1998 Commonwealth Games. Abeykoon also became the first Sri Lankan to win a Commonwealth Games medal in either men's and women's 100m event. During the heats, Abeykoon managed to set an all-time fastest ever timing in Commonwealth Games history in the heats after finishing with a timing of 10.06 seconds. The previous record in 100m men's heats record was held by Canada's Glenroy Gilbert who had finished his heat with a timing of 10.10 seconds during the 1994 Commonwealth Games. His timing of 10.06 seconds earned him a spot in the semi-finals. Yupun finished with a timing of 10.20 seconds semi-final which helped him to secure a berth into the final and was also the only Asian athlete to qualify for the final.

Palitha Bandara claimed a silver medal in men's F42-44/61-64 discus throw final after clearing a distance of 44.20 meters garnering 944 points. Bandara became the first Sri Lankan to win a Para Sports medal for Sri Lanka in Commonwealth Games history.

Track and road events

Field events

Badminton

On May 4, 2022, Badminton Sri Lanka named a team of eight athletes (four of each gender). Sri Lanka's also qualified for the team event after being one of the top 14 nations in the BWF Ranking as of February 1, 2022. The final team announcement dropped two women, meaning the final team size was six (four men and two women).

Mixed team

Summary

Squad

Dumindu Abeywickrama
Sachin Dias
Buwaneka Goonethilleka
Niluka Karunaratne
Thilini Hendahewa
Suhasni Vidanage

Group stage

Quarterfinals

Beach volleyball

On 19 March 2022, Sri Lanka qualified in both the men's and women's tournaments. This was achieved by both teams winning the Asian Qualifiers that were held in Negombo, Sri Lanka. This will be the first time Sri Lanka will be competing in the women's event. The teams were officially deemed as qualified on April 26, 2022.
Summary

Men's tournament

Group A

Quarterfinals

Women's tournament

Group B

Quarterfinals

Boxing

Sri Lanka entered eight boxers (five men and three women).

Men

Women

Cricket

Sri Lanka secured its place in the tournament by winning the Commonwealth Games Qualifier on 24 January 2022. The final roster of 15 athletes was named on July 19, 2022.

Summary

Roster
 
Chamari Athapaththu
Nilakshi de Silva
Kavisha Dilhari
Sachini Gonapinuwala
Achini Kulasuriya
Ama Kanchana
Sugandika Kumari
Hasini Perera
Udeshika Prabodhani
Inoka Ranaweera
Oshadi Ranasinghe
Anushka Sanjeewani
Harshitha Samarawickrama
Prasadani Weerakkody
Imesha Witharana

Group play

Diving

Sri Lanka entered one male diver.

Men

Gymnastics

Sri Lanka's gymnastics team consisted of eight athletes (three men and five women).

Artistic
Sri Lanka's artistic gymnastics team consisted of seven athletes (three men and four women).

Men
Team Final & Individual Qualification

Individual Finals

Women
Team Final & Individual Qualification

Individual Finals

Rhythmic
Sri Lanka entered one rhythmic gymnast.

Individual Qualification

Judo

Sri Lanka entered five judoka (three men and two women).

Rugby sevens

As of 28 November 2021, Sri Lanka qualified for both the men's and women's tournaments, for a total of 26 athletes (13 per gender). This was achieved after the country was the top ranked eligible nation during the 2021 Asia Rugby Sevens Series and 2021 Asia Rugby Women's Sevens Series respectively. The women's team will be making its Commonwealth Games debut.

Summary

Men's tournament

Roster
The roster was officially named on April 25, 2022.
 
Dilruksha Dange
Sudaraka Dikkumbura
Dansha Chandradas
Mithun Hapugoda
Ravindu Hettiarachchi
Buddhima Kudachchige
Kavindu Perera
Reeza Raffaideen
Nigel Ratwatte
Ashan Ratwatte
Chathura Senavirathne
Srinath Sooriyabandara
Adeesha Weerathunga

Pool A

Classification quarterfinals

13th-16th semifinals

13th place match

Women's tournament

Roster
The roster was officially named on April 25, 2022.

Anusha Attanayaka
Kumari Dilrukshi
Jeewanthi Gunawardhana
Sandika Hemakumari
Dilini Kanchana
Charani Liyanage
Shanika Madumali
Kanchana Mahendran
Dulani Pallikkondage
Ayesha Perera
Nipuni Rasanjali
Anushika Samaraweera
Umayangana Thathsarani

Pool A

Classification semifinals

Seventh place match

Squash

Sri Lanka's four member squash team (two men and two women) was named on July 3, 2022.

Singles

Doubles

Swimming

Sri Lanka entered two swimmers (one per gender).

Weightlifting

At the conclusion of the rankings period on February 28, 2022, Sri Lanka qualified ten weightlifters (six men and four women). Arshika Vijaybaskar later received a reallocated quota spot, increasing the team to 11 athletes (six men and five women). However, Vijaybaskar was not on the final team list.

Men

Women

Wrestling

On April 11, 2022, the Wrestling Federation of Sri Lanka selected six wrestlers (two men and four women) to compete at the games. A sixth wrestler, Shanith Chathuranga, scheduled to compete in the 74 kg, left the athletes village, and was believed to have fled. Nethmi Poruthotage won a bronze medal in the Women's 57 kg event, marking the country's first ever medal in the sport of wrestling and becoming the youngest ever Sri Lankan medalist at the Commonwealth Games.

Freestyle

Concerns and controversies
The participation of Sri Lanka at the games came at a critical juncture, especially with Sri Lanka facing its worst financial and economic crisis since independence. The athletes who are competing had endured severe difficulties to move on with their usual lifestyles and faced constraints with regard to training due to fuel shortages.

There were concerns raised by citizens and critics over Sri Lanka sending huge number of athletes for the 2022 Commonwealth Games at a time when Sri Lanka is in dire situation and foreign exchange crisis. Sri Lanka Cricket stepped in voluntarily during the need of the hour by financing the accommodation and travelling costs and expenses of participants and officials worth LKR 20 million.

As of 4 August 2022, at least 3 members of the Sri Lankan contingent are reportedly missing from the villages including a female judoka and a male wrestler. Sri Lankan administrators had asked its athletes and officials to hand over their passports ever since the news broke out regarding missing competitors.

See also
Sri Lanka at the 2022 World Athletics Championships

References

External links
Birmingham 2022 Commonwealth Games Official site

Nations at the 2022 Commonwealth Games
Sri Lanka at the Commonwealth Games
2022 in Sri Lankan sport